William Dexter (1818–1860) was an English-Australian painter.

Dexter was born at Melbourne, Derbyshire, England, and became an apprentice at the Derby China factory painting flowers and birds in the Chinese and Japanese styles. Dexter then studied at Paris, and returning to England, married Caroline née Harper at Nottingham in 1843. Dexter had a picture in the Royal Academy exhibition in 1851 and another in 1852. Dexter then sailed to Australia and arrived at Sydney on 8 October 1852.

Dexter was at Bendigo in August 1853, where William Howitt heard him advocating republican doctrines at a meeting of diggers. His wife came out from England at the end of 1854, and in March 1855 they together opened a gallery of arts and school of design in Bathurst Street, Sydney. This apparently was not a success for they went to live at Stratford, Victoria, in 1856, and there made the acquaintance of Angus McMillan. In 1857 Dexter exhibited six oils and three watercolours at the first Victorian Society of Fine Arts exhibition, held in Melbourne.

Soon afterwards he returned to Sydney as the Dexters had separated. He became a partner in a sign-writing business, dying there in 1860.

A book about William and Caroline, Folie A Deux: William and Caroline Dexter in Colonial Australia, was written by Patrick Morgan in 1999.

References

1818 births
1860 deaths
19th-century Australian artists